D'Andre Jerome Bishop (born 2 October 2002) is an Antiguan footballer who plays as a forward for Croatian third tier club Belišće and the Antigua and Barbuda national team.

Club career
In November 2021, Bishop joined German club 1. FC Mönchengladbach in the fifth-tier Oberliga.

In August 2022, Bishop joined Croatian side NK Belišće in the third-tier Second Football League.

International career
Bishop first played on the international stage at the 2017 CONCACAF Boys' Under-15 Championship in Bradenton, Florida.

He next appeared for the national under-17 team during 2019 CONCACAF U-17 Championship qualifying, notably scoring a brace in their 7–0 victory against Dominica on April 5. However, they finished second in their group after a loss to the Dominican Republic on the final matchday, thus failing to qualify for the finals.

In September 2019, he was first called up to the Antigua and Barbuda senior national team ahead of the 2019–20 CONCACAF Nations League B. He made his debut on September 6, coming on for Carl Osbourne during their 6–0 defeat to Jamaica. He was named in the starting XI in their match against Aruba three days later, where the sixteen-year-old scored in the eighth minute to lead his country to its first ever Nations League victory.

International statistics

International goals 
Scores and results list Antigua and Barbuda's goal tally first.

References

External links
 
 
 

Living people
2002 births
Antigua and Barbuda footballers
Antigua and Barbuda international footballers
Association football forwards
Antigua and Barbuda youth international footballers
People from Saint Peter Parish, Antigua